Monika Auer (born 21 April 1957 in Welschnofen) is an Italian luger who competed from the late 1970s to the mid-1980s. She is best known for he second-place overall Luge World Cup finish in women's singles in 1980-1.

Competing in two Winter Olympics, Auer earned her best finish of 13th in the women's singles event at Sarajevo in 1984. She won the gold medal in the women's singles event 1984 FIL European Luge Championships in Olang, Italy.

References
1980 luge women's singles results
1984 luge women's singles results
List of women's singles luge World Cup champions since 1978.
List of European luge champions 

Italian female lugers
1957 births
Living people
Lugers at the 1980 Winter Olympics
Lugers at the 1984 Winter Olympics
Olympic lugers of Italy
Italian lugers
People from Welschnofen
Sportspeople from Südtirol